Deir 'Ammar is a Palestinian town in the Ramallah and al-Bireh Governorate, located  northwest of Ramallah in the northern West Bank. According to the Palestinian Central Bureau of Statistics (PCBS), the town had a population of 2,414 inhabitants in mid-year 2006.

Deir 'Ammar, together with Beitillu and Jammala, form the new town of Al-Ittihad.

Location of Al-Ittihad
Al-Itihad is bordered by Kobar and Al-Zaytouneh to the east, Deir Abu Mash'al, Deir Nidham  and 'Abud to the north, Shabtin and Deir Qaddis  to the west, and Ras Karkar, Kharbatha Bani Harith, Al-Zaytouneh and Al Janiya to the south.

History
Potsherds from the Middle Bronze Age, Iron Age I, Iron Age II, Hellenistic, Roman and Mamluk eras have been found at Deir 'Ammar.

Ottoman era
Dayr Ammar was incorporated into the Ottoman Empire in 1517 with all of Palestine, and in 1596 it appeared in the  tax registers as being in the nahiya of Al-Quds in the liwa of Al-Quds. It had a population of 33 household;   who were all Muslims. They paid a fixed  tax-rate of 33.3 % on agricultural products, including wheat, barley, olive trees, vineyards/fruit trees, goats and beehives, in addition to occasional revenues; a total of 10,400 akçe. All of the revenue went to a Waqf. Potsherds from the early Ottoman era have also been found here.

In 1838 Deir Ammar was noted as  Muslim village in the Beni Harith district, north of Jerusalem.

In May, 1870, Victor Guérin found the village to be of equal importance to Jammala, and that there was a stream between the two villages where the women went for water when their own cisterns went dry. An official Ottoman village list from  about the same year, 1870, showed that Der Ammar had 35 houses and a population of 226, though the population count included only men.

In 1882, the PEF's Survey of Western Palestine described 'Deir Ammar as: "a village of medium size on a hill, with a well about 1/2 mile to the west."

In 1896 the population of  Der Ammar was estimated to be about 357 persons.

British Mandate era
In the 1922 census of Palestine conducted by the British Mandate authorities, Dair 'Ammar had a population of 265  Muslims,   increasing in the 1931 census to 316 Muslims in 81 houses.

In the 1945 statistics the population was 350 Muslims, while the total land area was 7,189 dunams, according to an official land and population survey. Of this, 2,242 were allocated for plantations and irrigable land, 1,615 for cereals, while 15 dunams were classified as built-up areas.

Jordanian era
In the wake of the 1948 Arab–Israeli War, and after the 1949 Armistice Agreements, Deir 'Ammar came under Jordanian rule. It was annexed by Jordan in 1950.

The Jordanian census of 1961 found 2,243 inhabitants in Deir 'Ammar.

1967-present
After the Six-Day War in 1967, Deir 'Ammar came under Israeli occupation.

After the 1995 accords, 41.2% of  Al-Ittihad land was classified as Area B, while the remaining 58.8% was classified as Area C. Israel has confiscated 858 dunams of land from Al-Ittihad for the construction of 4 Israeli settlements: Nahl'iel, Na'aleh, Talmon and Hallamish.

References

Bibliography

External links
  Welcome To Dayr 'Ammar
AL-Itihad Town (Fact Sheet),  Applied Research Institute–Jerusalem (ARIJ)
Al-Itihad Town Profile (Beitillu, Jammala & Deir 'Ammar), ARIJ 
Al-Itihad aerial photo, ARIJ
Survey of Western Palestine, Map 14:  IAA, Wikimedia commons 

Deir Ammar
Ramallah and al-Bireh Governorate
Municipalities of the State of Palestine